Martin Craft is an Australian songwriter, producer, and composer. Usually recording under the name M.Craft, he has released several albums on various labels, most recently signing with London's Heavenly Recordings. He is also known as a songwriter and collaborator for various other recording artists. For several years he played guitar and toured with Jarvis Cocker.

References

1976 births
Living people
People from Canberra
Australian rock singers
Australian record producers
Australian songwriters
Australian composers
21st-century Australian singers
679 Artists artists